Francis Egerton Grosvenor, 8th Earl of Wilton (born 8 February 1934) is a British aristocrat, financier, and academic. He is the eldest son of Robert Egerton Grosvenor, 5th Baron Ebury, and his first wife, Anne Acland-Troyte. He succeeded his father as 6th Baron Ebury in 1957, and his fourth cousin, Seymour William Arthur John Egerton, 7th Earl of Wilton, to the earldom in 1999. He is also heir presumptive to the title Marquess of Westminster held by his distant cousin the Duke of Westminster.

Career
Following a career in the financial services industry in London, Melbourne and Hong Kong, he attained a doctorate in Philosophy-Arts at Melbourne University, going on to teach there as 'Dr Francis Ebury'. The Earl was a member of the Board of Directors of Victorian Opera (Melbourne).

Personal life
The Earl has married three times:
He married firstly, on 10 December 1957 (marriage dissolved 1962), Gilian Elfrida Astley Elfin Soames, with issue:
Julian Francis Martin Grosvenor, Viscount Grey of Wilton (born 8 June 1959), married in 1987 (marriage dissolved by divorce 1990) Danielle Rossi.
He married secondly, on 8 March 1963 (marriage dissolved 1973), Kyra Aslin.
He married thirdly Suzanne Jean Suckling (4 August 1943 - 12 April 2018) in 1974, and they remained married until her death 44 years later. They had issue:
Lady Georgina Lucy Grosvenor (29 March 1973 — 16 August 2003), a noted violist, married in 2000 to Peter Mitev.
 
His third wife, Suzanne Jean Suckling, was a biographer who wrote under the name "Sue Ebury." (The Many Lives of Kenneth Myer; Weary the Life of Sir Edward Dunlop, Weary: King Of The River), She was also an editor and publisher; member of the Development Council of the National Library of Australia; and Patroness of the Australian Garden History Society.

Styles 

 The Hon Francis Grosvenor (1934–1957)
 The Rt Hon The Lord Ebury (1957–1999)
 The Rt Hon The Earl of Wilton (1999–present)

References
, Dr Francis Ebury, University of Melbourne: Publications
, The Peerage
, Cracrofts Peerage

External links
 The Genealogy of the Existing British Peerage: With Sketches of the Family Histories of the Nobility Saunders and Otley, 1838

1934 births
Earls in the Peerage of the United Kingdom
Francis
Eldest sons of British hereditary barons
Living people
Place of birth missing (living people)
Wilton